Selena was an American Tejano pop singer. She has been called the "Queen of Tejano music" by many media outlets including Entertainment Weekly, Billboard magazine, Los Angeles Magazine and Vibe. The singer had released eleven albums, six with her band Selena y Los Dinos and five without them: Mis Primeras Grabaciones (1984), Alpha (1986), Muñequito de Trapo (1987), And the Winner Is... (1987), Preciosa (1988), Dulce Amor (1988), Selena (1989), Ven Conmigo (1990), Entre a Mi Mundo (1992), Selena Live! (1993), Amor Prohibido (1994) and Dreaming of You (1995). They have sold more than 60 million copies worldwide. Her 10 award-winning songs include "Como La Flor", "Amor Prohibido", "Bidi Bidi Bom Bom", "Techno Cumbia", "Si Una Vez", "Tú Sólo Tú", "I Could Fall in Love", "Dreaming of You", "Siempre Hace Frio" and "No Quiero Saber".

Selena was nominated for 86 awards, with 67 wins. She won 36 Tejano Music Awards, 14 Billboard Latin Music Awards, 10 Lo Nuestro Awards, five BMI Awards and one award from the American Society of Composers, Authors and Publishers. In 1995, she was inducted into the Billboard Latin Music Hall of Fame. The Spirit of Hope Award was created in Selena's honor in 1996, and was awarded to Latin artists who participated in humanitarian and civic causes. By 1998, Selena and Proyecto Uno were the first artists to have won a Billboard Latin Music Award in two different genres.

Awards and nominations

ASCAP 
The American Society of Composers, Authors and Publishers (ASCAP) honors its top members in a series of annual awards shows in seven different music categories: pop, rhythm and soul, film and television, Latin, country, Christian and concert music. Selena received one award from one nomination.

|-
|rowspan="1"| 1995 || "I Could Fall in Love" || Among Most Performed Song || 
|}

Bandamax Music Awards 
The Bandamax Music Awards are a 24-hour cable television music channel owned by Televisa under Televisa Networks. It is available in Mexico, United States, and Latin America. This channel focuses on Mexican and Southern US group music: Banda, Duranguense, Norteña, and Mariachi. Selena has received 1 nomination.

|-
| 2015 || Selena || The Most Influential Artist on Social Media|| 
|-
|}

BMI Music Awards 
Broadcast Music, Inc. (BMI) annually hosts award shows that honor the songwriters, composers and music publishers of the year's most-performed songs in the BMI catalog. Selena received all five awards that she was nominated for.

|-
|rowspan="4"| 1995 || "Amor Prohibido" || BMI Pop Music Award || 
|-
| "Bidi Bidi Bom Bom" || Most Performed Song of the Year || 
|-
| "No Me Queda Mas" || Song of the Year || 
|-
| "Dreaming of You" || Singles With Over a Million Airplay Impressions || 
|-
| 1996 || "Si Una Vez" || Song of the Year || 
|}

Billboard Latin Music Awards 
The Billboard Latin Music Awards is an annual awards show broadcast on the television network Telemundo, honoring Latin artists. Selena received 16 awards from 20 nominations.

|-
|rowspan="2"| 1994 || Selena || Regional Mexican Artist of the Year, Female || 
|-
| Selena Live! || Regional Mexican Album of the Year, Female || 
|-
|rowspan="5"| 1995 || Selena || Hot Latin Tracks, Artist of the Year || 
|-
| Amor Prohibido || Regional Mexican Album of the Year, Female || 
|-
| "Amor Prohibido" || Regional Mexican Song of the Year || 
|-
| "No Me Queda Mas" || Music Video of the Year || 
|-
| Selena || Spirit of Hope Award || 
|-
|rowspan="4"| 1996 || Selena || Hot Latin Tracks Artist of the Year || 
|-
| "Tú Sólo Tú" || Regional Mexican Hot Latin Track of The Year || 
|-
| "Tú Sólo Tú" || Regional Mexican Hot Latin Video of The Year || 
|-
| Dreaming of You || Pop Album of the Year, Female || 
|-
| 2001 || All My Hits — Todos Mis Exitos Vol. 2 || Latin Greatest-Hit Album of the Year || 
|-
| 2002 || Live! The Last Concert || Pop album of the year, Female || 
|-
|rowspan="2"| 2011 || Selena || Female Vocalist of the Year || 
|-
| Selena || Digital Download Artist of the Year || 
|-
|rowspan="2"| 2016 || Selena || Top Latin Albums Artist of the Year, Female || 
|-
| Selena || Latin Pop Albums Artist of the Year, Solo || 
|-
|rowspan="3"| 2017 || Selena || Top Latin Albums Artist of the Year, Female || 
|-
| Selena || Latin Pop Albums Artist of the Year, Solo || 
|-
| Lo Mejor de... Selena || Latin Pop Album of the Year || 
|}

Billboard Mexican Music Awards
The Billboard Mexican Music Awards are awarded annually by the Billboard magazine in the United States. Selena has received one nomination.

|-
| 2013 || Selena || Digital Download Artist of the Year || 
|-
|}

Grammy Awards 
The Grammy Awards are awarded annually by the National Academy of Recording Arts and Sciences of the United States. Selena received two awards from four nominations.

|-
|1994 || Selena Live! || rowspan="2"|Best Mexican/American Album || 
|-
|1995 || Amor Prohibido || 
|-
| 2021 || Selena || rowspan="2"|Lifetime Achievement Award || 
|}

Hollywood walk of fame 

|-
|-
|2017
|Selena
|Hollywood Walk of Fame
|
|}

Lo Nuestro Awards 
The Lo Nuestro Awards is an awards show honoring the best of Latin music, presented by television network Univision. Selena received 12 awards from 12 nominations.

|-
| 1992 || Selena || Regional Mexican Female Artist || 
|-
|rowspan="3"| 1993 || Selena || Regional Mexican Female Artist || 
|-
|Entre a Mi Mundo || Regional Mexican Album of the Year || 
|-
| "Como La Flor" ||  Regional Mexican Song of the Year || 
|-
|rowspan="3"| 1994 || Selena || Regional Mexican Female Artist || 
|-
| Selena Live! || Regional Mexican Album of the Year || 
|-
| "No Debes Jugar" || Regional Mexican Song of the Year || 
|-
|rowspan="4"| 1995 || Selena || Female Pop Artist of the Year || 
|-
| Selena || Regional Mexican Female Artist || 
|-
| Amor Prohibido || Regional Mexican Album of the Year || 
|-
| "Amor Prohibido" || Regional Mexican Song of the Year || 
|-
| 1996 || Selena || Special Tribute Artist of the Year || 
|}

Tejano Music Awards 
Nominated for 48, Selena won 44Tejano Music Awards, which are awarded annually in San Antonio, Texas, honoring Tejano acts.

|-
| 1986 || Selena || Female Vocalist of the Year || 
|-
|rowspan="4"| 1987 || Selena || Female Vocalist of the Year || 
|-
| Selena || Most Promising Band of the Year || 
|-
| Alpha || Album of the Year – Orchestra || 
|-
| "Dame Un Beso" || Song of the Year || 
|-
|rowspan="3"| 1988 || Selena || Female Entertainer of the Year || 
|-
| "Terco Corazon" || Song of the Year || 
|-
| And the Winner Is ... || Album of the Year – Orchestra || 
|-
|rowspan="3"| 1989 || Selena || Female Entertainer of the Year || 
|-
| Selena || Female Vocalist of the Year || 
|-
| Dulce Amor || Album of the Year – Orchestra || 
|-
|rowspan="4"| 1990 || Selena || Female Vocalist of the Year || 
|-
| Selena || Female Entertainer of the Year || 
|-
| Selena || Album of the Year – Orchestra || 
|-
| "Amame, Quiéreme" || Vocal Duo of the Year || 
|-
|rowspan="3"| 1991 || Selena || Female Vocalist of the Year || 
|-
| Selena || Female Entertainer of the Year || 
|-
| Ven Conmigo || Album of the Year – Orchestra || 
|-
|rowspan="3"| 1992 || Selena || Female Vocalist of the Year || 
|-
| Selena || Female Entertainer of the Year || 
|-
| "La Carcacha" || Song of the Year || 
|-
|rowspan="4"| 1993 || Selena || Female Vocalist of the Year || 
|-
| Selena || Female Entertainer of the Year || 
|-
| Entre a Mi Mundo || Album of the Year – Orchestra || 
|-
| "Como La Flor" || Single of the Year || 
|-
|rowspan="4"| 1994 || Selena || Female Vocalist of the Year || 
|-
| Selena || Female Entertainer of the Year || 
|-
| Selena Live! || Album of the Year – Orchestra || 
|-
| "No Debes Jugar" || Single of the Year || 
|-
|rowspan="5"| 1995 || Selena || Female Vocalist of the Year || 
|-
| Selena || Female Entertainer of the Year || 
|-
| Amor Prohibido || Album of the Year – Orchestra || 
|-
| "Amor Prohibido" || Single of the Year || 
|-
| "Bidi Bidi Bom Bom" || Song of the Year || 
|-
|rowspan="6"| 1996 || Selena || Female Vocalist of the Year || 
|-
| Selena || Female Entertainer of the Year || 
|-
| Selena y Los Dinos || Showband of the Year || 
|-
| Dreaming of You || Album of the Year – Overall || 
|-
| "Tú Sólo Tú" || Song of the Year || 
|-
| "I Could Fall in Love" || Tejano Crossover Song of the Year || 
|-
|rowspan="4"| 1997 || Selena || Female Vocalist of the Year || 
|-
| Selena || Female Entertainer of the Year || 
|-
| "Siempre Hace Frio" || Song of the Year || 
|-
| "No Quiero Saber" || Tejano Crossover Song of the Year || 
|-
| 2001 || Selena || Lifetime Achievement Award || 
|-
|rowspan="3"| 2010 || Selena || Best Female Vocalist of the 1980s || 
|-
| Selena || Best Female Vocalist of the 1990s || 
|-
| "Bidi Bidi Bom Bom" || Best 1990s Song || 
|-
|}

References 

Selena
Awards